Liam Colahan (born 20 May 1990) is a former Zimbabwean rower. Along with his brother Ryan, he won a bronze medal in the men's lightweight double sculls at the 2007 All-Africa Games. He also competed at the 2007 and 2008 World Rowing Junior Championships.

References 

Zimbabwean male rowers
1990 births
Sportspeople from Harare
Living people
African Games bronze medalists for Zimbabwe
African Games medalists in rowing
Competitors at the 2007 All-Africa Games